Transcription factor RFX4 is a protein that in humans is encoded by the RFX4 gene.

This gene is a member of the regulatory factor X gene family, which encodes transcription factors that contain a highly conserved winged helix DNA binding domain. The protein encoded by this gene is structurally related to regulatory factors X1, X2, X3, and X5. It has been shown to interact with itself as well as with regulatory factors X2 and X3, but it does not interact with regulatory factor X1. This protein may be a transcriptional repressor rather than a transcriptional activator. Three transcript variants encoding different isoforms have been described for this gene.

References

Further reading

External links 
 

Transcription factors